Abu Tubar (literally The Hatchet Man) was the name given to the perpetrator of a series of robberies and murders committed in Baghdad during the early years of the Ba'ath Party rule. Although eventually ascribed to former members of Nadhim Kzar's (chief of the Directorate of General Security) police force, at the time there was widespread fear amongst the Baghdad population about the nature of the crimes.

Abu Tubar has achieved the title "hatchet man" in early 1970s. His real name was حاتم كاظم الهضم (Hatem Kazem Hathom); born 1932 in the city of Babylon, Hilla in Iraq. He was known as the man who brought fear and terror to the civilians of Iraq. He had a reputation of murdering families by chopping them with his hatchet. He usually began his crimes with a strange phone call, usually when the victim was alone at home. The call consisted of a useless conversation, threatening, and cursing. After the phone call, there was a knock on the door, after which the crime began.

The experience in Iraq
The citizens of Iraq at the time became worried and very fearful. People in Baghdad became more cautious: they became very protective. Individuals no longer went out alone, began to trim any trees and bushes around the neighbourhood to have a clear view of any potential hiding areas, and added more lights to keep them on all night for security. Being used to the safe environment in Iraq, these acts of Abu Tubar created tension and anxiety, which paralyzed the country. People began to create curfews for themselves and locked their homes more regularly. Television programs began to give safety instructions to viewers and so did call-in shows to train the citizens what to do if they saw him or any suspicious acts being found.

Early life and career
He lived in Babylon, Hilla and came from a very well-known and generous family in Iraq. He graduated elementary school in 1946 and graduated middle school in 1949. After that, he went to a police school in Hilla and ended up graduating in 1951 with a commissioner rank of police of Hilla but was fired in 1952 for professional reasons. He immediately returned to college to study the air force, however he was expelled in 1956 due to purposely fooling around in the air with the training planes. Hatem knew multiple languages, including Arabic, English, German, Persian, and even Kurdish. After getting expelled, he traveled to Kuwait to study free business in 1957, then returned to Iraq in 1959 to work as a collections accountant in Kirkuk. He got sentenced two and a half years in jail due to damaging (?) the company's state funds. After serving the time in jail, he left to explore Europe, spending most of his time in West Germany, Munich. Hatem began to smuggle weapons and cars from Belgium, Germany, Greece, Syria, and Turkey.

Later life
On March 30, 1974; 2:55 P.M. there was a report of a thief entering a neighbour's house that belonged to Doctor Joseph Paul Pedros Jadraji. The police came in time to catch the thief but their records showed Hatem as one of the air forces. This allowed him to keep lying about what he had done until they asked him to show them his house. They found many stolen items in his home, from expensive radios to jewellery and clothing. He admitted on national television the crimes he committed, as well the help he received from his two brothers, Galib and Hazim, his nephew Hussain, and his wife. When questioned about his motives Abu Tubar said he had two reasons why he killed people: one, to move freely in the house and enable him to steal anything; two, he admitted to having a psychological problem that sometimes he enjoyed killing, even drinking some of the victims' blood at times. His death took place in 1980, sentenced to death by hanging in Abu Ghraib prison.

See also
List of serial killers by country

References

1932 births
1980 deaths
20th-century executions by Iraq
Crime in Iraq
Executed Iraqi serial killers
Executed mass murderers
Family murders
Iraqi mass murderers
Male serial killers
People executed for murder
People from Babil Governorate
People from Baghdad
Serial killers who worked in law enforcement
Vampirism (crime)